Panchratna dal (also panchmel dal in Rajasthani cuisine, mughlai dal in royal Persian cuisine and pancha dhal in Caribbean cuisine) is a dal very popular in India, Pakistan, Guyana, Suriname and Trinidad and Tobago. As the name suggests, based on the Hindi/Sanskrit root "panch"/"pancha" for five, it is made by combining five kinds of dal common to Indian households. The word "panchratna" means five jewels. Lentils are an integral part of Indian cuisine. This is a dish customarily served at special occasions. It is usually accompanied by an Indian flat-bread or roti.

Composition of a panchratna dal 

Traditionally, a panchratna dal mixture contains equal quantities of toor dal, urad dal, moong dal, chana dal and moath dal. The dal mixture is first soaked in water to soften the lentils. This mixture is then pressure-cooked for 15 minutes till the dal is cooked. The cooked dal is then flavoured with butter, chilies, cumin, cloves, cardamom, ginger and garam masala.

Some recipes substitute masoor dal for the moath dal, which is less commonly available in some regions than the other four dals.

References

Indian cuisine
Pakistani cuisine
Indo-Caribbean cuisine